We Got This may refer to:
We Got This (Chopper City Boyz album), 2007
We Got This (Chuck Brown album), 2010
We Got This (O'G3NE album), 2016
"We Got This", song by A Day to Remember from Bad Vibrations 
We Got This, comedic debate-style podcast Maximum Fun